The Camino Real League is a high school athletic league that is part of the CIF Southern Section.

Member schools
 Bishop Montgomery High School (Torrance)
 Cantwell-Sacred Heart of Mary High School	(Montebello)
 La Salle College Preparatory (Pasadena)
 St. Genevieve High School (Panorama City)
 St. Mary's Academy (Inglewood)
 St. Monica Catholic High School (Santa Monica)
 St. Pius X - St. Matthias Academy (Downey)
 Salesian High School (Boyle Heights)

Popular culture
 In the film Gridiron Gang, the team of the Juvenile detention center "Mustangs" played against the teams of a fictionalised Camino Real League.

References

CIF Southern Section leagues
Christian sports organizations